Nong Han may refer to several places in Thailand:
 Nong Han Lake
 Nong Han Kumphawapi Lake
 Nong Han Luang
 Nong Han, San Sai, Chiang Mai Province
 Amphoe Nong Han, Udon Thani Province